The 1971–72 North Carolina Tar Heels men's basketball team represented University of North Carolina. The head coach was Dean Smith. The team played its home games in Chapel Hill, North Carolina, and was a member of the Atlantic Coast Conference.

Roster

Schedule

Awards and honors

Team players drafted into the NBA

References

North Carolina
North Carolina Tar Heels men's basketball seasons
North Carolina
NCAA Division I men's basketball tournament Final Four seasons
Tar
Tar